was a private university in Fukuchiyama, Kyoto, Japan. The predecessor of the school was founded in 1871, and it was chartered as a university in 2000.

It was changed to Seibi University in 2010.

External links
  

Educational institutions established in 1871
Private universities and colleges in Japan
Universities and colleges in Kyoto Prefecture
1871 establishments in Japan

ja:成美大学